Scythris triatma is a species of moth in the family Scythrididae first described by Edward Meyrick in 1935. It is endemic to New Zealand.

References

Scythrididae
Moths described in 1935
Moths of New Zealand
Endemic fauna of New Zealand
Taxa named by Edward Meyrick
Endemic moths of New Zealand